The Medicines and Healthcare products Regulatory Agency (MHRA) is an executive agency of the Department of Health and Social Care in the United Kingdom which is responsible for ensuring that medicines and medical devices work and are acceptably safe.

The MHRA was formed in 2003 with the merger of the Medicines Control Agency (MCA) and the Medical Devices Agency (MDA). In April 2013, it merged with the National Institute for Biological Standards and Control (NIBSC) and was rebranded, with the MHRA identity being used solely for the regulatory centre within the group. The agency employs more than 1,200 people in London, York and South Mimms, Hertfordshire.

Structure
The MHRA is divided into three main centres:
 MHRA Regulatory – the regulator for the pharmaceutical and medical devices industries
 Clinical Practice Research Datalink – licences anonymised health care data to pharmaceutical companies, academics and other regulators for research
 National Institute for Biological Standards and Control – responsible for the standardisation and control of biological medicines
The MHRA has several independent advisory committees which provide the UK Government with information and guidance on the regulation of medicines and medical devices. There are currently eight such committees:
 Advisory Board on the Registration of Homeopathic Products
 Herbal Medicines Advisory Committee
 The Review Panel
 Independent Scientific Advisory Committee for MHRA database research
 Medicines Industry Liaison Group
 Innovation Office
 Blood Consultative Committee
 Devices Expert Advisory Committee

History
In 1999, the Medicines Control Agency (MCA) took over control of the General Practice Research Database (GPRD) from the Office for National Statistics. The Medicines Control Agency (MCA) and the Medical Devices Agency (MDA) merged in 2003 to form MHRA.  In April 2012, the GPRD was rebranded as the Clinical Practice Research Datalink (CPRD). In April 2013, MHRA merged with the National Institute for Biological Standards and Control (NIBSC) and was rebranded, with the MHRA identity being used for the parent organisation and one of the centres within the group.  At the same time, CPRD was made a separate centre of the MHRA.

Roles

 Operate post-marketing surveillance – in particular the Yellow Card Scheme – for reporting, investigating and monitoring of adverse drug reactions to medicines and incidents with medical devices.
 Assess and authorise of medicinal products for sale and supply in the UK.
 Oversee the Notified Bodies that ensure medical device manufacturers comply with regulatory requirements before putting devices on the market.
 Operate a quality surveillance system to sample and test medicines to address quality defects and to monitor the safety and quality of unlicensed products.
 Investigate internet sales and potential counterfeiting of medicines, and prosecute where necessary.
 Regulate clinical trials of medicines and medical devices.
 Monitor and ensure compliance with statutory obligations relating to medicines and medical devices.
 Promote safe use of medicines and devices.
 Manage the Clinical Practice Research Datalink and the British Pharmacopoeia.

The MHRA hosts and supports a number of expert advisory bodies, including the British Pharmacopoeia Commission, and the Commission on Human Medicine which replaced the Committee on the Safety of Medicines in 2005.

The MHRA manages the Early Access to Medicines Scheme (EAMS), which was created in 2014 to allow access to medicines prior to market authorisation where there is a clear unmet medical need.

European Union 
Prior to the UK's departure from the European Union in January 2021, the MHRA was part of the European system of approval. Under this system, national bodies can be the rapporteur or co-rapporteur for any given pharmaceutical application, taking on the bulk of the verification work on behalf of all members, while the documents are still sent to other members as and where requested.

From January 2021, the MHRA is instead a stand-alone body. However, under the Northern Ireland Protocol the authorisation of medicines marketed in Northern Ireland continues to be the responsibility of the European Medicines Agency.

Funding
The MHRA is funded by the Department of Health and Social Care for the regulation of medical devices, whilst the costs of medicines regulation is met through fees from the pharmaceutical industry. This has led to suggestions by some MPs that the MHRA is too reliant on industry, and so not fully independent.

In 2017, the MHRA was awarded over £980,000 by the Bill & Melinda Gates Foundation to fund its work with the foundation and the World Health Organization on improving safety monitoring for new medicines in low and middle-income countries. In response to a Freedom of Information request, in 2022 the MHRA stated that approximately £3million had been received from the Gates Foundation for a number of initiatives spanning several financial years.

Key people 
Dr June Raine has been the chief executive of the MHRA since 2019, succeeding Dr Ian Hudson who had held the post since 2013.

The MHRA's strategy is set by a board which consists of a chairperson (appointed for a three-year term by the Secretary of State for the Department of Health and Social Care) and eight non-executive directors, together with the chief executive and chief operating officer. The chair since September 2020 is Stephen Lightfoot, who is also chair of Sussex Community NHS Foundation Trust and non-executive chair of Sussex Primary Care Limited. Sir Michael Rawlins was the chair from 2014 to 2020.

Covid-19 interventions

On vaccines 
On 2 December 2020, the MHRA became the first global medicines regulator to approve an RNA vaccine when it gave conditional and temporary authorization to supply for use of the Pfizer–BioNTech COVID-19 vaccine codenamed BNT162b2 (later branded as Comirnaty). This approval enabled the start of the UK's COVID-19 vaccination programme. The regulator's public assessment report for the vaccine was published in 15 December.

The MHRA went on to give conditional and temporary authorization to supply of further vaccines: AZD1222 from Oxford University and AstraZeneca on 30 December, mRNA-1273 from Moderna on 8 January 2021, and a single-dose vaccine from Janssen on 28 May 2021. The approval of the Pfizer-BioNTech vaccine was extended to young people aged 12–15 in June 2021, 5–11 in December 2021, and from six months in December 2022.

The status of the Oxford / AstraZeneca vaccine was upgraded to conditional marketing authorisation on 24 June 2021. The MHRA confirmed in September 2021 that supplementary "booster" doses of these vaccines would be safe and effective, but stated that the Joint Committee on Vaccination and Immunisation had the task of advising if and when they should be used in this way. Later that month, the MHRA said the Moderna vaccine could also be given as a booster dose.

In August and September 2022, the MHRA approved the first bivalent COVID-19 booster vaccines.

On tests 
In January 2021, the MHRA expressed concern to the UK government over plans to deploy lateral flow tests in schools in England, stating that they had not authorised daily use of the tests due to concerns that negative results may give false reassurance. The government suspended the scheme the following week, citing risks arising from high prevalence of the virus and higher rates of transmission of a new variant.

Criticism

In 2005, the MHRA was criticised by the House of Commons Health Committee for, among other things, lacking transparency, and for inadequately checking drug licensing data.

The MHRA and the US Food and Drug Administration were criticised in the 2012 book Bad Pharma, and in 2004 by David Healy in evidence to the House of Commons Health Committee, for having undergone regulatory capture, i.e. advancing the interests of the drug companies rather than the interests of the public.

The 2016 reclassification of CBD oil and other hemp products as a medicine has been criticized as cruel and disproportionate to those using them.

See also
 Black triangle scheme
 List of pharmacy organisations in the United Kingdom
 European Medicines Agency
 Food and Drug Administration (United States)
 Regulation of therapeutic goods

References

External links
 
 National Institute for Biological Standards and Control (NIBSC) website
 Clinical Practice Research Datalink (CPRD) website

2003 establishments in the United Kingdom
Canary Wharf
Department of Health and Social Care
Executive agencies of the United Kingdom government
Health in the London Borough of Tower Hamlets
Pharmacy organisations in the United Kingdom
Medical regulation in the United Kingdom
National agencies for drug regulation
Organisations based in the London Borough of Tower Hamlets
Organizations established in 2003
Regulators of biotechnology products
Regulators of the United Kingdom
Regulation of medical devices